Aciman is a surname. Notable people with the surname include:

Alexander Aciman (born 1990), American writer and journalist
André Aciman (born 1951), Italian-American writer and academic
Stella Aciman (born 1953), Turkish novelist, columnist, and businesswoman

See also
Acidman